The Shamiram canal, also known as the Semiramis canal and previously as the Menua canal, is a canal located to the east of Van, Turkey that runs 45 miles long, supplying a large region and flowing into Lake Van. King Menua of Urartu built the Semiramis canal, according to his inscriptions, which are still visible by the canal. Menua's canal, which brought fresh water to the capital city of Tushpa, has survived to the present day and is known to the people of the Van region as the "canal of Semiramis".

History

One Urartian inscription found near the canal announces its construction:

Banister Fletcher wrote,

References

Urartu